Vesperus serranoi is a species of beetle in the Vesperidae family that is endemic to the Iberian Peninsula.

References

Vesperidae
Beetles described in 1985
Endemic fauna of the Iberian Peninsula
Beetles of Europe